Kangoeroes Basket Mechelen, also known as Kangoeroes or Kangoeroes Mechelen, is a basketball club based in Mechelen, Belgium. Founded in 2009, the club plays in the BNXT League. Kangoeroes have been playing in the top tier division in Belgium for  years, since 2013.

Previously, the team played in Boom and Willebroek. In 2018, the club moved to Mechelen.

History

The club was founded in 2009, as a result of a merger between BBC Kangoeroes Willebroek and Boom BBC. The team name was BBC Kangoeroes Boom, but in summer 2013 the team was renamed Kangoeroes Basket Willebroek. In the 2013–14 season, Kangoeroes entered the professional first tier Ethias League. The Kangoeroes received a C-licence from the Belgium Basketball Federation. This license allowed the team to play with a considerably lower budget than other teams.

Move to Mechelen
In January 2018, Kangoroes announced it would move the team to the city of Mechelen starting from the 2018–19 season. The arena in Willebroek did not fulfill the needs of the Division I. With its merger the club would merge with Pitzemburg Basket and the new team was Kangoeres Basket Mechelen.

Since the 2021–22 season, Kangoeroes plays in the BNXT League, in which the national leagues of Belgium and the Netherlands have been merged.

Arenas

Names
'BBC Kangoeroes-Boom (2009–2013)
Kangoeroes Basket Willebroek (2013–2018)
Kangoeroes Basket Mechelen (2018–present)

Honours

BNXT Belgian Championship
Runners-up (1): 2021–22

Belgian Cup
Runners-up (1): 2020–21
Belgian Second Division
Champions (1): 2010–11
Runners-up (2): 2009–10, 2012–13

Season by season

Players

Current roster

Notable players

 Toarlyn Fitzpatrick (1 season: 2013–14)
 Eduardo Hernández-Sonseca (1 season: 2013–14)
 Mohamed Kherrazi (1 season: 2020–21)
 Jito Kok (2 seasons: 2019–21)
 Domien Loubry (2 seasons: 2020–present)
 Wen Mukubu (1 seasons: 2021–present)

Individual awards

BNXT League Dream Team
Myles Stephens – 2022
Wen Mukubu – 2022
BNXT League Player of the Year
Wen Mukubu – 2022
BNXT League Coach of the Year
Kristof Michiels – 2022

Head coaches
 Yves Defrainge (February–May 2018)
 Paul Vervaeck (2018–present)

Women's basketball

Current roster

References

External links
Official website 
Kangoeroes Basket Willebroek at Ethias League website

Basketball teams in Belgium
Basketball teams established in 2009
Pro Basketball League